Place Bonaventure is an office, exhibition, and hotel complex in Downtown Montreal, Quebec, Canada, adjacent to the city's Central Station. At   in size, Place Bonaventure was the second largest commercial building in the world at the time of its completion in 1967. It is one of very few buildings in Canada to have its own postal code prefix, H5A.

History
Place Bonaventure was first conceived as an exhibition hall, international trade centre, and hotel. Construction began in 1964, and was completed in 1967.

Designed in the Brutalist style, the exterior walls are poured-in-place, ribbed sand-blasted concrete, with the interior walls sand-blasted concrete or brick.

Concordia Hall was a  exhibition hall.  The first trade show was hosted in 1966, while the upper floors were still being constructed.  Adjacent to this vast space are two large mezzanines. In 2020, it was announced that the exhibition hall would close (due to larger spaces available today, like the nearby Palais des congrès de Montréal [Montreal Convention Center]).

When Place Bonaventure opened, there were five floors of wholesale suppliers above Concordia Hall, featuring fashions, home furnishings, and children's toys. An additional floor contained the offices of the principal trading nations of the world. At ground level there were two floors of retail shopping mall. All these uses disappeared over the years.

In 1998 Place Bonaventure was renovated at an expense of 60 million CAD.  The building was re-designed to offer large, continuous office space. Retail space was quite reduced. Windows were added to all four sides, on all floors, to allow light into the new office spaces.

The building takes its name from Bonaventure Station, a former railway station located nearby. A planned expansion to the south was never constructed.

Today, Place Bonaventure belongs to Kevric real estate corporation which owns many buildings in Montreal and Toronto.

Tenants

The complex houses a 397-room rooftop hotel, Hotel Bonaventure Montreal (formerly a Hilton Hotel), featuring a year-round heated rooftop outdoor pool, a 2.5 acres rooftop garden with trees, flowers and waterfalls, a jacuzzi and a dry sauna. Hotel's meeting space total's 50,000 sqft, fully renovated in 2018 and boasts Montreal's largest Ballroom without obstructions (15,000 sqft) as well as 20,000 sqft of exhibit space. Major tenants also include the Société de transport de Montréal (headquarters), Fido, Cogeco radio stations (except for CFGL-FM), BMO Financial Group and a few federal government departments.

Access
Place Bonaventure is connected to Montreal's underground city. It is also linked to the Bonaventure Metro station, to the AMT commuter train stations (Lucien-L'Allier and Central Station), AMT's downtown bus terminus and to inter-city train service (Via and Amtrak at Central Station).

References

Sources

External links

 

1967 establishments in Quebec
Arcop buildings
Brutalist architecture in Canada
Buildings and structures completed in 1967
Convention centres in Canada
Downtown Montreal
Shopping malls in Montreal